Mounir Fatmi (born 1970 in Tangier, Morocco) is a Moroccan artist who lives and works in Paris. As a young boy, he traveled to Rome where he studied at the free school of nude drawing and engraving at the Academy of Arts, and then later at the School of Fine Arts in Casablanca, Morocco (1989), School of Fine Arts, Rome, Italy (1991), and finally studied at the Rijksakademie in Amsterdam. 

His multimedia practice encompasses video, installation, drawing, painting and sculpture, and he works with obsolete materials.

In 2006, he won the Uriöt prize, the grand prize of the Dakar Biennial and the Cairo Biennial Award in 2010.

Biography

Professional career

1990–1995 
In 1993, Fatmi received first prize at the Third Biennial of Young Moroccan Painting, for the "Fragile / Communication" series and met Catherine David.

In 1995, he becomes known outside of Morocco from his work with videos. He was selected at the International Videokunstpreis at the ZKM3 in Karlsruhe.

1996–2000 

In 1999, he met curator Jean-Louis Froment and participated in the exhibition "L'objet désorienté" at the Museum of Decorative Arts in Paris, where he made the sculpture Connections.

2001–2010 
In 2004, Fatmi was invited by Simon Njami and Jean-Hubert Martin to participate in the exhibition "Africa remix" at the Kunstpalast museum in Düsseldorf, the Hayward Gallery in London, the Georges Pompidou Center in Paris, the Mori art museum in Tokyo, the Moderna museum in Stockholm, and the Johannesburg Art Gallery in Johannesburg.

Fatmi held his solo exhibition "Fuck architects, chapter I" at the Lombard project in New York.

2011–present 
Fatmi began experiencing censorship in 2011.

His work Modern Times, a History of the Machine is selected for the Jameel Prize 3 of the Victoria & Albert Museum in London, in 2013, and is exhibited in group shows related to this award at the Hermitage-Kazan Exhibition Center, the Moscow Manege, the Sharjah Museum of Islamic Civilization, and the National Library of Singapore.

In 2016, he launched The Exile Pavilion and organized the first stage at the National Archives Museum in Paris. He was selected for the exhibition "Fundamental" at the Fifth Mediations Biennale of Poznan and for the Triennial of Setouchi Awashima Community Area in Japan. In 2017, he participates in the exhibition The Absence of Paths: 1st Tunisian Pavilion at the 57th Venice Biennale.

Work 
Fatmi's installations and films have the specificity to be produced with archaic and outdated material, such as VHS tapes.

Many of Fatmi's works are seen as subversive, such as his Brainteaser for moderate Muslims, a series of Rubik's Cubes painted in black with white stripes to imitate the Kaaba in Mecca. As a reaction to the Arab Spring, he exhibited The Lost Spring.

Awards
 Shortlisted Jameel Prize 3, Victoria and Albert Museum, London, 2014

Exhibitions

Solo show

2017 
 Transition State, Officine dell'Immagine, Milan
 Survival Signs, Jane Lombard Gallery, New York
 Fragmented Memory, Goodman Gallery, Johannesburg
 Inside the Fire Circle, Lawrie Shabibi, Dubai

2018 
 The Human Factor, Tokyo Metropolitan Teien Art Museum, Tokyo
 The Day of the Awakening, CDAN Museum - Centro de Arte Y Naturaleza, Huesca 
 180° Behind Me, Göteborgs Konsthall, Göteborg

Group exhibitions

2017 
 57th Venice Bienale 2017, NSK State Pavilion, Venice
 Cut Up / Cut Out, Bellevue Arts Museum

2018 
 Cut Up/Cut Out, Museum of Arts & Sciences, Daytona Beach
 Revolution Generations, Mathaf Arab Museum of Modern Art, Doha

Publications
 Mounir Fatmi (Le Parvis centre d'art contemporain, 2006)
 Hard Head (Lowave, 2006)
 Fuck the Architect (Lowave, 2009)
 Megalopolis (AKBank Sanat, 2010)
 Ghosting (studio mounir fatmi, 2011)
 Suspect Language (Skira Editore, 2012)
 The Kissing Precise (LaMuette, 2014)
 History is not mine (Rencontres de Bamako, 2015)
 Survival Signs (SF publishing, 2017) 
 The Missing Show (SF publishing, 2018)
 180° Behind Me, mounir fatmi, SF Publishing (2019)
 The Day of the Awakening, mounir fatmi, SF Publishing (2019) 
 The White Matter, SF Publishing (2019) 
 The Process, SF Publishing (2019) 
 The Index and The Machine, (2020) 
 Keeping Faith, Keeping Drawing (2020) 
 Transition State (2020) 
 Peripheral Vision (2020) 
 Fragmented Memory (2020) 
 A Savage Mind (2020) 
 They were blind, they only saw images (2020) 
 Inside the Fire Circle (2020) 
 Suspect Language (2020) 
 Ghosting (2020) 
 Kissing Circles (2020) 
 History is not mine (2020) 
 Intersections (2020) 
 Oriental Accident (2020) 
 Seeing is Believing (2020) 
 Light and Fire (2021) 
 Art of War (2021) 
 Something is Possible (2021) 
 Between the Lines (2021) 
 Fuck Architects: Chapter 1 (2021) 
 Hard Head (2021) 
 In Search of Paradise (2021)

References

External links
Official website
Profile page at Artfacts.com
Analix Forever
Paradise Row
Edge Of Arabia - Contemporary art and creative movements from the Arab World

1970 births
Living people
Moroccan contemporary artists
Moroccan male artists